Pia Babnik (born 2 January 2004) is a Slovenian professional golfer. She won the 2019 R&A Girls Amateur Championship. In 2020, 16 years old, she joined the Ladies European Tour, were she won two tournaments the year after. 18 years old, she finished third at one of the professional major championships, the 2022 Chevron Championship.

Early life and amateur career
ht by her father, and joined her first junior golf competition at age four, where she made her first birdie. 

She has two younger brothers, twins Jaka and Ziga, who both represented Slovenia at the 2022 European Boys' Team Championship.

She won all age groups national titles in Slovenia and won many international junior competitions. 

Babnik played her first professional tournament at age 12 on the 2016 LET Access Series, the CitizenGuard LETAS Trophy in Belgium, and made the cut. She represented Slovenia at the 2017 European Girls' Team Championship and would do so again at the 2018 and 2019 European Ladies' Team Championship.  In 2019, at age 15, she won the individual title, ahead of last years winner and world amateur number one, Frida Kinhult. 

Babnik set a record low score in the 2018 Trnovo Masters with 58 strokes (−10). At the 2018 Mediterranean Games, she won bronze medal with Vida Obersnel and Ana Belac in the women's team event. 

At 15 years old, Babnik played her first LET tournament, the 2019 Czech Ladies Open, and again made the cut. The same year, she won the Helen Holm Scottish Women's Open Championship at Royal Troon ahead of runner-up Charlotte Bunel of France, with a seven-shot margin of victory and a record 15-under aggregate. Only Ireland's Leona Maguire at a mere 14 in 2009 had been a younger champion. Babnik returned to Scotland to take home the centenary Girls Amateur Championship at Panmure Golf Club, defeating Austria's Isabella Holpfer in the 18-hole final, 4 and 3. Through her victory, she earned exemptions into Final Qualifying for the 2020 Women's British Open, as well as the Womens Amateur Championship and the Augusta National Women's Amateur Championship. 

Babnik  qualified for the Junior Solheim Cup and represented Europe in the competition at Gleneagles, and also in the continent's Junior Vagliano Trophy team which triumphed at Royal St George's Golf Club. Babnik became World Amateur Golf Ranking ranked at the age of ten and finished 2019 in fifth place on the WAGR ranking and completed her amateur career with a +7.0 handicap.

Professional career
Babnik illustrated her talent by securing a card at the final stage of LET Qualifying School at age 16, the youngest in the field at the La Manga Club in Spain. She finished well inside the top 20 at 11th place to earn her playing rights on the 2020 Ladies European Tour. 

By October 2020, she had made the cut in all her LET starts and was 25th on the Order of Merit. She finished top-10 at the Women's NSW Open and the Czech Ladies Open and came close to winning the Lavaux Ladies Open, a LET Access Series event in Switzerland, but lost a playoff to Agathe Laisné. 

In June 2021, she won the Jabra Ladies Open after a playoff with Annabel Dimmock. In November 2021, she secured her second Ladies European Tour title at the Aramco Team Series – Jeddah

Babnik reached her best finish so far at one of the major championships in women's golf, at the 2022 Chevron Championship at Mission Hills Country Club in Rancho Mirage, California. With a six-under-par score of 66 in the final round, Babnik advanced to third place, behind Jennifer Kupcho and Jessica Korda, and earned $334,972.

Amateur wins
2016 Evolve Spanish Junior Championship
2017 Slovenian Junior Masters, The German Futures Girls Division, Slovenian Amateur Championship, Srixon Norwegian Winter Open (Mar Menor)
2018 Trnovo Masters, Winter Series El Valle
2019 Girls Amateur Championship, Helen Holm Scottish Women's Open Championship, Evolve Spanish Junior Championship, Slovenian National Match Play, US Kids - European Championship, Atlantic Youth Trophy, Portuguese Intercollegiate Open

Source:

Professional wins (2)

Ladies European Tour wins (2)

Results in LPGA majors

CUT = missed the half-way cut
T = tied

Summary

World ranking
Position in Women's World Golf Rankings at the end of each calendar year.

^ as of 18 April 2022

Team appearances
Amateur
European Girls' Team Championship (representing Slovenia): 2017
European Ladies' Team Championship (representing Slovenia): 2018, 2019
Mediterranean Games (representing Slovenia): 2018  
Junior Solheim Cup (representing Europe): 2019
Junior Vagliano Trophy (representing the Continent of Europe): 2019 (winners)

Source:

References

External links

Slovenian female golfers
Ladies European Tour golfers
Olympic golfers of Slovenia
Golfers at the 2020 Summer Olympics
Mediterranean Games medalists in golf
Mediterranean Games bronze medalists for Slovenia
Competitors at the 2018 Mediterranean Games
Sportspeople from Ljubljana
2004 births
Living people
21st-century Slovenian women